Michael Marx (born July 7, 1958) is an American foil and epee fencer and fencing master. He is the brother of Robert Marx, who has also represented the U.S. in multiple Olympic fencing events.  Michael and his brother were taught to fence by their mother, fencing coach Colleen Olney, who is considered by many prominent fencers to be "the mother of fencing in Oregon".

Fencing career
Marx won a silver medal in foil at the World University Games in 1985. He is an 8-time United States national men's foil champion (1977, 1979, 1982, 1985, 1986, 1987, 1990, and 1993).  He is also a five-time Olympian in both foil and epee (1980, 1984, 1988, 1992, and 1996). Although Marx qualified for the 1980 Olympic team he did not compete due to the Olympic Committee's boycott of the 1980 Summer Olympics in Moscow, Russia. He was one of 461 athletes to receive a Congressional Gold Medal instead. Marx won the silver medal in team foil at the Pan American Games in 1979 and 1983, and the bronze in 1987.  He won the bronze medal in individual foil in 1987.

USFA
He served as vice president of the United States Fencing Association (USFA) from 1992 and 1996. He is a staff member of the USFA Coaches College.

Coaching career
Marx received his Master of Arms degree in Poland in 1993 after spending several months studying under Prof. Zbigniew Czajkowski at the Academy of Physical Education in Katowice. In recent years he has served as the U.S. national women's épée coach, and his students have included U.S. Team member Cody Mattern.

Marx was fencing master at Northwest Fencing Center in Beaverton, Oregon, until 2008 when he accepted a position as full-time assistant coach at Duke University in North Carolina. Marx returned to Northwest Fencing Center after a year as a coach at Duke University.  Since January 2010 he has been Director of Fencing Operations at the Boston Fencing Club.

In July 2014, Marx founded Marx Fencing Academy, located in Concord, Massachusetts.

Awards
Marx was inducted into the USFA Hall of Fame in 1997. In 2003, Marx was inducted into the Oregon Sports Hall of Fame, the first fencer to be so honored. Marx is also a 5-time USOC Athlete of the Year. In 2007 he was named Developmental Coach of the Year by the USFA.

See also
List of USFA Division I National Champions

References

External links
 Pan Am Game results
 Marx Fencing Academy

1958 births
Living people
American male foil fencers
American male épée fencers
Olympic fencers of the United States
Fencers at the 1984 Summer Olympics
Fencers at the 1988 Summer Olympics
Fencers at the 1992 Summer Olympics
Fencers at the 1996 Summer Olympics
Congressional Gold Medal recipients
Fencers from Portland, Oregon
Sportspeople from Beaverton, Oregon
Pan American Games silver medalists for the United States
Pan American Games bronze medalists for the United States
Pan American Games medalists in fencing
Universiade medalists in fencing
Fencers at the 1979 Pan American Games
Fencers at the 1983 Pan American Games
Fencers at the 1987 Pan American Games
Universiade silver medalists for the United States
Medalists at the 1985 Summer Universiade
Medalists at the 1987 Pan American Games